Rogerline Johnson (1927 in Columbus, Arkansas – 1996 in Helena, Arkansas) was an American photographer, best known for his photos of African-American life in the Arkansas Delta in the 1950s and 1960s.

He maintained a portrait studio, but also traveled the Arkansas Delta region to photograph lakeside baptisms, blues festivals, and daily life. A major exhibition of his work appeared at the Arkansas State Capitol in Little Rock. Prior to doing photographic work, Rogerline Johnson taught and coached at local schools after earning a degree from Arkansas Agricultural, Mechanical and Normal College in 1948.

Since his death, the Johnson studio has remained open through the work of his wife and children.  A portion of his work is currently displayed at the Delta Cultural Center.  His studio, now run by his son, Stephen Johnson, is located on Columbia Street in Helena-West Helena, Arkansas.

References
African-American Life in the Arkansas Delta: Through the Lens of Rogerline Johnson, 1952-1971

1996 deaths
People from Hempstead County, Arkansas
University of Arkansas at Pine Bluff alumni
1927 births
People from Helena, Arkansas
Photographers from Arkansas